Sundararajan is an Indian politician. He is a member of the All India Anna Dravida Munnetra Kazhagam party. He was elected as a member of Tamil Nadu Legislative Assembly from Sankari Constituency in May 2021.

References 

Living people
People from Tamil Nadu
Tamil Nadu politicians
All India Anna Dravida Munnetra Kazhagam politicians
Tamil Nadu MLAs 2016–2021
Year of birth missing (living people)